TRNA (adenine58-N1)-methyltransferase (tRNA m1A58 methyltransferase, tRNA (m1A58) methyltransferase, TrmI, tRNA (m1A58) Mtase, Rv2118cp, Gcd10p-Gcd14p, Trm61p-Trm6p) is an enzyme with systematic name S-adenosyl-L-methionine:tRNA (adenine58-N1)-methyltransferase. This enzyme catalyses the following chemical reaction

 S-adenosyl-L-methionine + adenine58 in tRNA  S-adenosyl-L-homocysteine + N1-methyladenine58 in tRNA

The enzyme specifically methylates adenine58 in tRNA.

References

External links 
 

EC 2.1.1